The 2015 Danish Individual Speedway Championship was the 2015 edition of the Danish Individual Speedway Championship. In contrast to previous years, the final was staged over a single round, at Slangerup, and was won by Niels Kristian Iversen. It was the fourth time Iversen had won the national title, having also been victorious in 2012, 2013 and 2014.

Event format 
Each rider competed in five rides, with the four top scorers racing in an additional heat. The points from the additional heat were then added to the previous score from the five riders. The winner was the rider who accumulated the most points in all of their rides, and not the rider who won the additional heat.

Final

References 

Denmark
Speedway in Denmark
2015 in Danish motorsport